Skyline Park (also known as Allgäu Skyline Park) is a 35-hectare (86-acre) amusement park in Bad Wörishofen, Bavaria, Germany. The facility includes several thrill rides, family attractions, and playground amenities. The park is run by the Löwenthal family of showmen.

History

Kirchdorf Leisure Park and Skyline Park's beginnings (1975–1998)

The beginnings of Skyline Park can be traced back to the Kirchdorf Leisure Park in Stadtbergen, a town within the district of Augsburg. The park - essentially a giant playground - was located there from 1975 to 1991, but a disagreement with the land's owner over expansion plans led to the park's move to its present location in Bad Wörishofen. The Leisure Park's attractions consisted mainly of several slides, pedal-powered rides, and an electric-powered car ride. The park began to install larger rides in the late 90s, most notably with the addition of the Anton Schwarzkopf roller coaster Silberpfeil. In 1999, the park was bought by the Löwenthal family of showmen and was formally reopened as Skyline Park. Park owner Joachim Löwenthal quickly brought a multitude of larger rides into the park upon its acquisition, including the Sky Rider suspended roller coaster and Bob Racing powered bobkart attraction.

Continued growth and development (2004–2014)

In the spring of 2004, the Löwenthal family approached Maurer Söhne (now knows as Maurer AG), a German firm whom were at the time making headlines around the industry with their innovative X-Car coaster design. The park opened the Sky Wheel roller coaster in late 2004, and formally in 2005. The coaster was shaped like a vertical arc and described to the public as a "ferris wheel without spokes". The success of the Sky Wheel resulted in several similar attractions and X-Car designs built around the world over the next several years, with varying degrees of success.

In 2009, the former Condor was purchased from Heide Park and rechristened as the Sky Twister. The Autoscooter bumper cars, which were installed during the previous year, was expanded in order to become the largest bumper car attraction in Germany. For the 2010 season, Skyline Park added the Sky Rafting rapids ride, which had formerly traveled on the fair circuit with the Löwenthal family. Its addition was a part of a 2-hectare expansion to the northeast corner of the park.

The 2012–2013 seasons saw Skyline Park purchase two retired attractions from the United Kingdom. For the 2012 season, the Sky Jet thrill ride was added near the Sky Rafting. The ride was a Zierer Star Shape that had formerly operated as Bling at Blackpool Pleasure Beach from 2004 to 2011. Sky Jet was removed following the 2019 season and sold to Fantasy Island in the UK. For the 2013 season, the park purchased the Whirlwind, a Maurer AG spinning coaster, from the former Camelot Theme Park, which had ceased operations in late 2012. The coaster was refurbished and rechristened as Sky Spin.

Expansion and further investments (2015–present)

Various new attractions were installed at the park during an expansion to the western side of the property between 2015 and 2019. During this time, the Italy-based SBF Visa Group provided multiple rides, most notably the High Fly pendulum ride, Kids Spin junior spinning coaster, and Zero Gravity rotor. Joachim Löwenthal retired two well-known attractions from the fair circuit and permanently installed them at the park, in 2017 and 2019, respectively; Wildwasserbahn III (1992), the world's largest transportable log flume, and Geisterschlange (1979), a ghost train style dark ride. The headlining installation, however, was Sky Dragster, a prototype Spike Coaster from Maurer AG. On this attraction, riders straddle a monorail-ensue track and are able to control the speed of their car. Although the coaster concept won various innovation awards, it ultimately suffered from severe mechanical failures throughout its lifetime, to the point that for a period of time in 2020 park management brought the coaster's long-term viability into question.

For the 2020 season, two major new rides were added to the park. As the ongoing COVID-19 pandemic had cancelled festivals across Europe, Löwenthal invited Sky Fall's operators – the Goetzke family – to set up the attraction at the park in order to make a profit. Although it was intended to only be rented out for 5 months, the Sky Fall stayed at the park through to the 2021 season. The second attraction was the Allgäuflieger, a Funtime Starflyer attraction.

It is reported that Bavarian manufacturer Gerstlauer will manufacturer the project. In the meantime, the park will install three attractions from SBF Visa, to be installed between 2023 and 2024; the launched Berg- und Tal Hetz, children's coaster Flotter Otto, and the Looping Alois thrill ride.

Rides

Roller coasters

Water rides

Rides

Other attractions
Humoristisches Velodrom - An arena filled with disproportionally designed bicycles.
Kids Farm - A large children's playground, built in 2015.
Sky Jump - A bungee trampoline attraction for children.
Sky Walk - A zipline obstacle course suspended above the ground, installed in 2015.
Spassbad - A swimming pool area with a small pair of waterslides, built in 2004.
Trampolin - Trampolines.
Wasserspielplatz - A water hole and area where children can cool off.

Former attractions

Gallery

References

External links
 Skyline Park's Official Website

Amusement parks in Germany
Amusement parks opened in 1999
Tourist attractions in Bavaria
Buildings and structures in Bavaria
Economy of Bavaria